Lou D'Allesandro (born July 30, 1938) is a Democratic member of the New Hampshire Senate, representing the 20th district since 1998. D'Allesandro has served as chair of Senate Finance and vice chair of the Ways & Means and Capital Budget committees. Previously he was a member of the New Hampshire Executive Council from 1975 to 1981 and the New Hampshire House of Representatives from 1996 through 1998 and from 1972 to 1974. D'Allesandro appears frequently on the Paul Westcott Show on WGIR (AM) and WQSO.

A 1956 graduate of Worcester Academy and of the University of New Hampshire (UNH) in 1961, D'Alessandro was a three-year letterman on the football team, and served as the team's co-captain during his senior season in 1960–61. He was also a two-year member of the lacrosse team and played one year of baseball for the Wildcats.  While at UNH, he was a member of the Phi Kappa Theta fraternity. He was inducted into the UNH Hall of Fame on September 25, 2010.

In 1963, D'Allesandro became the first athletic director and men's basketball coach at Southern New Hampshire University (known then as New Hampshire College), where he was instrumental in helping the school achieve NCAA status. As head coach, the men's basketball team won three consecutive conference titles from 1964–65 to 1966–67. He was inducted into the SNHU Penmen Hall of Fame in 1970.

A biography of D'Allesandro, Lou D'Allesandro: Lion of the New Hampshire Senate and Thoughts for Presidential Hopefuls, by Mark C. Bodanza, was published in 2018.

Early life
D'Allessandro was born and raised in East Boston. At three years old, a house fire occurred in his family's tenement, and he was saved by the Boston Fire Department.

Footnotes

External links
The New Hampshire Senate - Senator Lou D'Allesandro official NH Senate website
Project Vote Smart - Senator Lou D'Allesandro (NH) profile
Follow the Money - Lou D'Allesandro
2006 2004 2002 2000 1998 campaign contributions
New Hampshire Senate Democratic Caucus - Lou D'Allesandro profile

 (alt)

21st-century American politicians
1938 births
Living people
Democratic Party members of the New Hampshire House of Representatives
Democratic Party New Hampshire state senators
New Hampshire Wildcats baseball players
New Hampshire Wildcats football players
New Hampshire Wildcats men's lacrosse players
Southern New Hampshire Penmen athletic directors
Southern New Hampshire Penmen men's basketball coaches
Lacrosse players from Massachusetts
Politicians from Boston
Sportspeople from Boston
People from East Boston, Boston
Players of American football from Massachusetts
Baseball players from Massachusetts